Muratcan Güler (born February 25, 1980) is a Turkish professional former basketball player. He is currently playing for Beşiktaş of the Turkish Basketball League. He plays the point guard position and 1.88 m (6'2") tall and weighs 82 kg (180 lb).

He is son of former basketball player Necati Güler and older brother of basketball player Sinan Güler. He studied at Istanbul Kültür University.

International career
Muratcan Güler has been called up sometimes for Turkish national team.

References

External links
 TBLStat.net Profile

1980 births
Living people
Antalya Büyükşehir Belediyesi players
Beşiktaş men's basketball players
Galatasaray S.K. (men's basketball) players
Istanbul Kültür University alumni
Karşıyaka basketball players
Point guards
Basketball players from Istanbul
Türk Telekom B.K. players
Turkish men's basketball players
Ülker G.S.K. basketball players